Greene County is a county located in the U.S. state of Arkansas. As of the 2020 census, the population was 45,736. The county seat is Paragould, which sits atop Crowley's Ridge.

Greene County is included in Jonesboro–Paragould Combined Statistical Area.

History

Greene County was formed on 5 November 1833 out of portions of Lawrence County and originally contained parts of present Clay and Craighead counties. The county was named for Revolutionary War hero Nathanael Greene.  The first county seat was in Benjamin Crowley's home. By 1836, when Arkansas became a state, the county seat was located in a settlement called "Paris" (not to be confused with present-day Paris, Arkansas).

In 1848 a national highway was made through the area, and the county seat was moved to Gainesville, which had a reputation as rather lawless. The seat remained there until 1883, when it was transferred to the new town of Paragould. The people in Gainesville opposed the move, and shots reportedly were fired, since tempers were high. The courthouse was built in 1888 and survives in downtown Paragould.

In the early 20th century, Clay, Greene, and Craighead counties had policies forbidding African Americans from living in the area.

Geography

Major highways

  U.S. Highway 49
  U.S. Highway 49 Business
  U.S. Highway 49Y
  U.S. Highway 63
  U.S. Highway 412
  U.S. Highway 412 Business
  Highway 1
  Highway 34
  Highway 69
  Highway 90
  Highway 135
  Highway 139
  Highway 141
  Highway 168
  Highway 228
  Highway 351
  Highway 358

Adjacent counties
 Clay County (north)
 Dunklin County, Missouri (east)
 Craighead County (south)
 Lawrence County (southwest)
 Randolph County (northwest)

Demographics

2020 census

As of the 2020 United States census, there were 45,736 people, 17,254 households, and 12,280 families residing in the city.

2010 census
As of the 2010 census, there were 42,090 people living in the county. The racial makeup of the county was 95.4% White, 0.6% Black, 0.5% Native American, 0.3% Asian, <0.1% Pacific Islander, <0.1% from some other race and 1.1% from two or more races. 2.1% were Hispanic or Latino of any race.

2000 census
As of the 2000 census, there were 37,331 people, 14,750 households, and 10,708 families living in the county.  The population density was 65 people per square mile (25/km2).  There were 16,161 housing units at an average density of 28 per square mile (11/km2).  The racial makeup of the county was 97.45% White, 0.13% Black or African American, 0.42% Native American, 0.17% Asian, 0.02% Pacific Islander, 0.47% from other races, and 1.34% from two or more races.  1.16% of the population were Hispanic or Latino of any race.

There were 14,750 households, out of which 33.10% had children under the age of 18 living with them, 59.20% were married couples living together, 9.70% had a female householder with no husband present, and 27.40% were non-families. 24.00% of all households were made up of individuals, and 11.00% had someone living alone who was 65 years of age or older.  The average household size was 2.49 and the average family size was 2.95.

In the county, the population was spread out, with 25.20% under the age of 18, 9.10% from 18 to 24, 28.70% from 25 to 44, 23.10% from 45 to 64, and 13.90% who were 65 years of age or older.  The median age was 36 years. For every 100 females, there were 95.30 males.  For every 100 females age 18 and over, there were 91.90 males.

The median income for a household in the county was $30,828, and the median income for a family was $37,316. Males had a median income of $27,535 versus $20,375 for females. The per capita income for the county was $16,403.  About 9.90% of families and 13.30% of the population were below the poverty line, including 15.40% of those under age 18 and 12.80% of those age 65 or over.

Government
Over the past few election cycles, Greene County has swung hard towards the GOP. The last Democrat to carry this county was Al Gore in 2000. Twenty years later, Joe Biden failed to even garner twenty percent of the county's vote.

Communities

Cities
 Marmaduke
 Paragould (county seat)

Towns
 Delaplaine
 Lafe
 Oak Grove Heights

Unincorporated communities
 Beech Grove
 Cotton Belt
 Fontaine
 Gainesville
 Hopewell
 Light
 Walcott
 Walnut Corner

Townships

 Blue Cane
 Breckenridge (Lafe)
 Bryan
 Cache
 Clark (most of Paragould)
 Collier
 Crowley
 Evening Shade
 Friendship
 Hays
 Hopewell
 Hurricane (Marmaduke)
 Jones (Delaplaine)
 Lake
 Main Shore
 Poland
 Reynolds
 St. Francis (small part of Paragould)
 Salem
 Shady Grove
 Spring Grove (part of Paragould)
 Sugar Creek
 Union (Oak Grove Heights)
 Walnut Corner

Education
School districts include:
 Greene County Technical School District
 Marmaduke School District
 Paragould School District
 It consists of the boundary of the original Paragould School District, plus the Oak Grove School district, which merged with the former Paragould district on July 1, 1985, and the Stanford School District. The new merged district was originally called the Northeast Arkansas School District; b 1997 the name of the new district became the Paragould School District.
 Rector School District
 The Greenway School District and the former Rector District merged into the Clay County Central School District on July 1, 1984. The name of the merged district later became the Rector School District.

Former districts:
 Delaplaine School District - Consolidated into Greene County Technical in 2004.

See also
 Lake Frierson State Park
 List of lakes in Greene County, Arkansas
 National Register of Historic Places listings in Greene County, Arkansas

References

External links

 Greene County Online
 Paragould Regional Chamber of Commerce

 
1833 establishments in Arkansas Territory
Populated places established in 1833
Jonesboro-Paragould Combined Statistical Area
Sundown towns in Arkansas